The Jersey national netball team represents Jersey in international netball.

References

External links
 Official webpage

National netball teams of Europe
netball